Tickle Me is an extended play by Elvis Presley containing songs from the motion picture of the same name. It was released by RCA Victor in 1965.

In the UK, there were not one but two accompanying soundtrack EPs released, Tickle Me Vol. 1 and Tickle Me Vol. 2.

Content 
For the first time in his career, the budget did not allow new songs to be commissioned for a Presley film. The soundtrack was assembled from previously released recordings, recycling nine songs in total with some dating back to recording sessions from 1960.

All songs were taken, as originally pressed, from previously released albums but a new vocal was recorded for "I Feel That I've Known You Forever", and a harmony vocal and narration was removed on "I'm Yours".

Four of the songs were released on singles, with the other five on an extended play single as the official soundtrack. "(Such an) Easy Question," by Otis Blackwell and Winfield Scott, was paired with "It Feels So Right" by Fred Wise and Ben Weisman. Released previously on Pot Luck with Elvis and Elvis Is Back! respectively, they were reissued as catalogue 47-8585 in June 1965, with the A-side "Easy Question" going to No. 11 on the Billboard Hot 100 and the B-side peaking at No. 55 independently. A second pairing, "I'm Yours" by Don Robertson and Hal Blair also from Pot Luck with "(It's a) Long Lonely Highway" by Doc Pomus and Mort Shuman from Kissin' Cousins, were reissued as the A and b sides respectively of catalogue item 47-8657 in August 1965, "I'm Yours" also peaking on the chart at No. 11.

"I'm Yours" was released on 45 rpm as presented on film and the flip side was the movie opening number "(It's a) Long, Lonely Highway" , but in an alternate take.

The soundtrack EP was issued in June 1965 containing the other five songs. It only reached No. 70 on the singles chart, another indication of format's lack of appeal by the mid-1960s, although the fact its contents featured songs that were already available on various still-in-catalog albums may have also played a role. RCA would only issue one more extended play single for Presley in 1967.

In the UK, a Tickle Me Vol. 2 EP was issued containing the four tracks released on singles in the US.

In the 1960s, to obtain all nine songs in long-playing format, one would have to acquire Elvis Is Back!, Something for Everybody, Pot Luck, and the Fun in Acapulco and Kissin' Cousins soundtracks (which featured some of the songs as non-movie "bonus tracks"). In 2005, Sony Music issued a compact disc soundtrack of Tickle Me on their specialty Presley-oriented collectors label, Follow That Dream. It featured the film's nine songs along with five bonus tracks.

Reissues
Tickle Me was reissued on the Follow That Dream label in 2005 in a deluxe 2-disc CD collection containing the original Extended Play along with numerous alternate takes from the original recording sessions.

Personnel
 Elvis Presley – vocals; guitar (recordings prior to June 1961)
 The Jordanaires, Millie Kirkham – backing vocals
 Boots Randolph – saxophone
 Scotty Moore, Hank Garland, Harold Bradley, Grady Martin, Jerry Kennedy – electric guitar
 Floyd Cramer – piano
 Bob Moore – double bass
 D. J. Fontana, Buddy Harman  – drums

Track listing

Tickle Me, Vol. 1

Tickle Me, Vol. 2 (UK only)

Charts

References

External links 

 Tickle Me Vol. 1 at AllMusic
 Tickle Me Vol. 2 at AllMusic

1965 EPs
1965 soundtrack albums
Elvis Presley soundtracks
RCA Records soundtracks
Elvis Presley EPs
RCA Records EPs
Musical film soundtracks
Comedy film soundtracks